This is a list of the chief justices of Malta.

References

Malta
Chief Justice
List